Virginia's first aeronautical event was in Williamsburg, Virginia, when a balloon flight was launched from the College of William & Mary using wine spirits for fuel.

Events 

Thaddeus S. C. Lowe and the Union Army Balloon Corps during the Peninsula Campaign of the American Civil War
 3 September 1908 - Orville Wright flew the first heavier than air flight in Virginia from Fort Myer.
 Late 20th Century: SST flights of the Concorde from Dulles International.

Aircraft Manufacturers 
 Dynamic Aviation

Aerospace 
 Northrop Grumman Innovation Systems.
Wallops Flight Facility and the Mid-Atlantic Regional Spaceport on the Eastern Shore of Virginia.

Airports

Commercial Service 
Washington Dulles International Airport provides international air service.

People
David M. Brown Astronaut from Arlington Virginia who flew in STS-107 mission.
Richard E. Byrd, Polar aviator

Organizations 
  Virginia Aeronautic Historical Society
 Virginia Airport Operators Council

Government and Military
All flight operations in Virginia are conducted within FAA oversight.
The Virginia Department of Aviation manages state airport policy.
The Virginia Air National Guard is the Air Reserve Component of the U.S. Air Force.

Museums 
Virginia Aviation Museum Richmond.
Steven F. Udvar-Hazy Center, part of the National Air and Space Museum, opened 2003
Virginia Air and Space Center in Hampton, Virginia
Air Power Park in Hampton, Virginia

Gallery

References 

 
Transportation in Virginia